The M58 is a short metropolitan route in the City of Cape Town, South Africa connecting the town of Durbanville and the village of Philadelphia.

References 

Metropolitan routes in Cape Town
Roads in Cape Town